Hypoptopoma incognitum is a species of catfish of the family Loricariidae.

This catfish reaches a maximum length of  SL. It is demersal, being found in fresh water in the tropics.
 
Hypoptopoma incognitum is native to South America, occurring in across the central and lower Amazon River basin; including the Rio Tocantins basin. It is the only species known for north-eastern coastal rivers.

Interactions with humans
Hypoptopoma incognitum is harmless to humans.

References

Aquino, A.E. and S.A. Schaefer, 2010. Systematics of the genus Hypoptopoma Günther, 1868 (Siluriformes, Loricariidae). Bull. Amer. Mus. Nat. Hist. 336:1-110. 

Hypoptopomatini
Catfish of South America
Taxa named by Adriana Elbia Aquino
Taxa named by Scott Allen Schaefer
Fish described in 2010